The Wuhle is a small right-bank tributary of the Spree. It originates in a ground moraine in Brandenburg near Ahrensfelde and flows through the Berlin boroughs of Marzahn-Hellersdorf and Treptow-Köpenick before joining the Spree.

It is the primary in- and outflow of the Wuhlebecken.

The Wuhle is depicted in the coat of arms of Marzahn-Hellersdorf.

See also

 List of rivers of Brandenburg

Rivers of Brandenburg
Rivers of Germany